Uley Long Barrow, also known locally as Hetty Pegler's Tump, is a Neolithic burial mound, near the village of Uley, Gloucestershire, England.

Details
Although typically described as a long barrow, the mound is actually a transepted gallery grave. It was probably built before 3000 BC.

It contains a stone-built central passage with two chambers on each side and another at the end. The earthen mound is surrounded by a dry-stone revetting wall.

The barrow was archaeologically excavated in 1821, revealing the remains of fifteen skeletons and a later, intrusive Roman age burial above the northeast chamber. It was excavated again in 1854. 

The mound is nicknamed after Hester, wife of the 17th-century landowner Henry Pegler. Hester died in 1694, and Henry in 1695. It is clearly signposted from the side of the nearby Crawley Hill (B4066 road) between Uley and Nympsfield.

The barrow was reopened in 2011 after a short closure for essential health and safety work.

See also
List of English Heritage properties

References

External links

Megalithic Portal: Hetty Peglers Tump
English Heritage: Hetty Pegler's Tump

Buildings and structures in Gloucestershire
English Heritage sites in Gloucestershire
Megalithic monuments in England
Stone Age sites in England
Archaeological sites in Gloucestershire
Tourist attractions in Gloucestershire
Barrows in the United Kingdom
Scheduled monuments in Gloucestershire